This article lists the winners of the Amsterdam Marathon, which was first held during the 1928 Summer Olympics (men's competition only) and annually from 1975 onwards, with the exception of 1978.

The current course records of 2:03:38 (men) and 2:17:57 (women) were set in the 2021 edition by Tamirat Tola and Angela Tanui respectively. 

Ferenc Szekeres, Cor Vriend, Sammy Korir, Plonie Scheringa, and Marja Wokke won the Amsterdam Marathon each two times, and Gerard Nijboer won the marathon four times.

Men's winners

Women's winners

Victories by nationality

References

Amsterdam Marathon Statistics
 Palmares Marathon d'Amsterdam

Amsterdam
Sport in Amsterdam
Marathon
Amsterdam Marathon